Joanna Wołoszyk (née Kozłowska, born 19 January 1995) is a Polish handball player for Saint-Amand Handball and the Polish national team.

She participated at the 2016 European Women's Handball Championship, 2017 World Women's Handball Championship and 2018 European Women's Handball Championship. In season 2017/2018 she played in the Women's EHF Champions League and Women's EHF Cup where she scored 33 goals in 11 matches. The next season was player in Pogon Szczecin. She has come to final EHF Challenge Cup where her team Pogon lost with Rocasa Gran Canaria. In the 2019/20 season, she played for the Turkish Champion's team where she won the Turkish Super Cup and get 1/4 EHF Cup. In the Turkish league, the Kastomonu team was in 1st place where they won all matches in the Turkish league. In 2020, she joined french club Saint-Amand Handball.

Statistics

Honours
Polish League:
Winner: 2017

Challenge Cup:
Silver Medalist: 2019

Polish Cup:
Winner: 2014, 2015, 2016

Super Cup of Turkish:
Winner: 2019

Carpathian Trophy:
Winner: 2017

References

External links

1995 births
Living people
Polish female handball players
People from Sztum
Expatriate handball players in Turkey
Polish expatriate sportspeople in France
Polish expatriate sportspeople in Turkey